Mercyville is an unincorporated community in Macon County, in the U.S. state of Missouri.

History
Mercyville was laid out in the 1860s, and named after Mercy Williams, the wife of a local blacksmith. In 1888, the majority of the population removed to nearby Elmer after the railroad was extended to that point. A post office called Mercyville was established in 1867, and remained in operation until 1889.

References

Unincorporated communities in Macon County, Missouri
Unincorporated communities in Missouri